The 1972 Holton Tennis Classic, also known as the St. Louis WCT, was a men's professional tennis tournament that was part of the 1972 World Championship Tennis circuit. It was held on outdoor hard courts at the Dwight Davis Tennis Center in Forest Park in St. Louis, Missouri in the United States. It was the second edition of the tournament and was held from June 26 through July 2, 1972. Seventh-seeded John Newcombe won the singles title and earned $10,000 first-prize money.

Finals

Singles
 John Newcombe defeated  Nikola Pilić 6–3, 6–3
 It was Newcombe's 2nd singles title of the year and the 14th of his career in the Open Era.

Doubles
 John Newcombe /  Tony Roche defeated  John Alexander /  Phil Dent 7–6, 6–2

References

Tennis in Missouri
1972 in American tennis